Lewis "Bata" Kent (born Lajco Kapolnai; 8 September 1927 – 22 June 2014) was an Australian politician. He was a member of the Australian Labor Party (ALP) and represented the Division of Hotham in federal parliament from 1980 to 1990. He was born in Yugoslavia and came to Australia via Israel after the Second World War.

Early life
Kent was born on 8 September 1927 in Subotica, Yugoslavia, in present-day Serbia. His birth name was Lajco Kapolnai, which he later anglicised. Of Jewish origin, he grew up in the town of Sombor, where all but five of his high school classmates were killed when the Axis powers invaded in 1941. He recalled seeing "Hungarian troops blow a retired teacher's brains out with a grenade as the teacher answered a call at his front door". He later narrowly escaped being captured by the SS, and due to curfews and bombings was unable to continue assisting an elderly relative, who starved to death.

Kent and his cousin escaped to Hungary towards the end of the war, where they received false identity papers that listed them as Hungarian nationals. They were treated as such by the Soviet Army, which made them participate in an 11-day forced march to a prison camp. His cousin died of typhoid in the camp, but he was able to escape after a few months and made his way to Belgrade. He had difficulties in post-war Yugoslavia and eventually left for Israel, where he joined the Israeli Communist Party and stood unsuccessfully for public office.

Move to Australia
After moving to Australia, Kent worked on the railways for 26 years and attained the rank of stationmaster. He joined the Australian Labor Party (Victorian Branch) and in the late 1960s served as president of the party's New Australian Committee. He expressed concerns that the party's platform was still sympathetic to the White Australia policy and called for non-discriminatory immigration to be made an explicit policy plank.

Kent also served as chairman of the Yugoslav Welfare Society. In December 1977, he attributed the bombing of the Jat Airways offices in Melbourne to Croatian separatists in the Ustaše. He warned of possible inter-ethnic violence if the police did not intervene, stating "ninety percent of Croats are good citizens but a small percentage are terrorist types".

Parliament
Kent was elected to parliament at the 1980 federal election, defeating the incumbent Liberal member Roger Johnston in the Division of Hotham. He was re-elected at the 1983, 1984 and 1987 elections. He served on several parliamentary committees and joined a number of parliamentary delegations to other countries.

Kent was a member of the Labor Left faction and came into conflict with the Hawke Government on a number of occasions. In 1986, he walked out of Paul Keating's budget speech, along with Peter Milton and John Scott, when it was announced that the government would resume uranium sales to France. During the debate over the introduction of the Australia Card, Kent said that it was un-Australian and that it would be more appropriate to call it a Hitlercard or Stalincard.

In November 1989, Liberal MPs Ken Aldred and Jim Short alleged that Kent was "an agent of a foreign power" and had ties to the UDBA, the Yugoslav secret police. Their allegations were based on a statutory declaration from a member of Melbourne's Yugoslav community. Kent vigorously denied their claims, describing them as a smear campaign. He was suspended from parliament for 24 hours for using unparliamentary language. The House of Representatives later voted on party lines to suspend Aldred for two days, following a report from the privileges committee.

Kent's political career ended at the 1990 federal election, when he attempted to transfer to the newly created Division of Corinella. He was defeated by the Liberal candidate Russell Broadbent.

Later life
Kent died in June 2014. He had two children with his wife Vera, who died a few years earlier.

References

Australian Labor Party members of the Parliament of Australia
Members of the Australian House of Representatives for Hotham
Members of the Australian House of Representatives
1927 births
2014 deaths
20th-century Australian politicians
Australian anti–nuclear power activists
Australian people of Serbian-Jewish descent
Yugoslav emigrants to Israel
Israeli emigrants to Australia
Maki (historical political party) politicians